Thallarevu is a hamlet of Polekurru in East Godavari district of the Indian state of Andhra Pradesh. Its name literally mean ferry of toddy palm trees. It is located in Thallarevu mandal of Kakinada revenue division.

References 

Hamlets in Andhra Pradesh